is a short film in the Ojarumaru anime series that was released in Japan on July 15, 2000. The film was shown in conjunction with Mon Colle Knights the Movie: The Legendary Fire Dragon and The Mysterious Tatari-chan.

Plot
The short film introduces Semira, a strange boy who comes to play with Ojarumaru and his chums and bears a marked resemblance to a boy of the same name who spent a summer with the village elders when they were boys, long ago.

Cast
Hiroko Konishi - Ojarumaru Sakanoue
Rie Iwasubo - Denbo Sanjūrō
Yuriko Fuchizaki - Kazuma Tamura
Harumi Ikowa - Kintarō "Kin-chan" Sakata
Masako Nozawa - Semira
Kazuya Ichijō - Aobee
Yuji Ueda - Kisuke
Omi Minami - Akane
Satomi Koorogi - Ai Tamura
Toshiya Ueda - Tomio "Tommy" Tamura

Home media
The film was released on VHS by Nippon Crown on November 22, 2000 in Japan. Nippon Crown later released the film on DVD on July 25, 2001.

References

External links

2000 anime films
Gallop (studio)
Toei Company films
2000s animated short films
Anime short films